Dawuan Station (DWN) is a class III railway station located in Central Dawuan, Cikampek, Karawang Regency, Indonesia.

From the station there is a branch line to one of the industrial areas of PT Pupuk Kujang, but the lane is no longer active.

Services 
The following is a list of train services at the Dawuan Station.

Passenger services 

References 

karawang Regency
Railway stations in West Java
railway stations opened in 1902